Kango is a town in the Estuaire Province of Gabon, Central Africa, lying on the Komo River and the N1 road.  It has a station near the Trans-Gabon Railway, where the railway bridges the Gabon Estuary.

Kango is a small town with a population of about 4,771 according to 2013 census reports The town lies at an altitude of 3 meters above mean sea level and is known for its wildlife.

See also 
 Railway stations in Gabon

References 

Populated places in Estuaire Province
Komo Department